Provincial elections were held in the Pakistani province of North-West Frontier Province to elect the members of the 8th Provincial Assembly of North-West Frontier Province on 10 October 2002, alongside nationwide general elections and three other provincial elections in Sindh, Balochistan and Punjab. The remaining two territories of Pakistan, AJK and Gilgit-Baltistan, were ineligible to vote due to their disputed status. The elections were held under the military government of General Pervez Musharraf.

Results

References

Elections in Khyber Pakhtunkhwa
2002 elections in Pakistan